Edward Emmett Courtenay (born February 2, 1968) is a Canadian former professional ice hockey right winger and head coach.

Professional career
As a youth, Courtenay played in the 1980 and 1981 Quebec International Pee-Wee Hockey Tournaments with a minor ice hockey team from Verdun.

Following Courtenay's junior hockey career with Laval Titan and Granby Bisons in the Quebec Major Junior Hockey League (QMJHL) he was signed by the Minnesota North Stars as a free agent on 1 October 1989. Minnesota assigned Courtenay to play with Kalamazoo Wings in the International Hockey League (IHL) where he spent his first three professional seasons.

Courtenay was selected by the San Jose Sharks in the 1991 Dispersal Draft when the NHL expanded to include San Jose. During the 1991–92 and 1992–93 seasons Courtenay played 44 NHL games for San Jose.

Courtenay spent the next four seasons playing for the Kansas City Blades, the Chicago Wolves, the Peoria Rivermen and the San Francisco Spiders in the IHL; the Reno Renegades in the West Coast Hockey League (WCHL); and the Jacksonville Lizard Kings and the South Carolina Stingrays in the East Coast Hockey League (ECHL) before joining the Sheffield Steelers in the United Kingdom to play in the Ice Hockey Superleague (ISL) in 1997. Courtenay played for Sheffield for three seasons before signing for the Ayr Scottish Eagles for the 2000–01 and 2001–02 seasons, also in the ISL.

Courtenay returned to North America when he was signed as a free agent by the Verdun Dragons of the Quebec Semi-Pro Hockey League (QSPHL) on 12 July 2002 for the 2002–03 season. Courtenay returned to the South Carolina Stingrays for the 2003–04 and 2004–05 seasons before he returned to Europe as a player/coach with the Belfast Giants in 2005. He guided the team to Elite Ice Hockey League (EIHL) league success in 2006. Courtenay's tenure as head coach ended after the 2007/08 season and he was succeeded by Steve Thornton.

Coaching career 
Courtenay played for the EIHL club Newcastle Vipers, after being persuaded to come out of retirement by head coach Rob Wilson, and joined on 6 August 2009 to the Manchester Phoenix as an assistant coach.

Retirement from ice hockey 

As of March 2010 after returning home to South Carolina for a family visit, Courtenay applied for a job outside of ice hockey with soft drinks giant Pepsi in the Carolinas area.  His application was successful, meaning he would not be returning to the Phoenix; he is now considered retired.

On July 21, 2011, it was revealed Courtenay is being considered for the coaching vacancy for the South Carolina Stingrays, along with Stingrays assistant Spencer Carbery and Colgate University assistant coach Brad Dexter.

Awards
 ECHL Most Valuable Player 1996–97.
 Named to the ISL All Star first team in 1998, 1999 and 2000.
 Sekonda Face to Watch for October 1999.
 Sekonda Superleague Player of the Year 1999–00.
 British Ice Hockey Writers' Association Player of the Year Trophy 1999–00.
 Named to the ISL All Star second team in 2002.
 Named to the EIHL All Star first team in 2006.

Records
 ECHL leading point scorer for 1996–97. (shared with Mike Ross)
 ECHL most power play goals for 1996–97.
 ISL most goals for 1997–98.
 ISL most power play goals for 1997–98.
 ISL leading point scorer for 1999–00.

Career statistics

Regular season and playoffs

Footnotes

References
 A to Z Encyclopaedia of Ice Hockey
 Ice Hockey Journalists UK

External links
 

1968 births
Anglophone Quebec people
Ayr Scottish Eagles players
Belfast Giants players
Canadian ice hockey coaches
Canadian ice hockey right wingers
Chicago Wolves (IHL) players
Granby Bisons players
Ice hockey people from Montreal
Ice Hockey Superleague players
Jacksonville Lizard Kings players
Kalamazoo Wings (1974–2000) players
Kansas City Blades players
Laval Titan players
Living people
Manchester Phoenix players
People from Verdun, Quebec
Peoria Rivermen (IHL) players
Reno Renegades players
San Francisco Spiders players
San Jose Sharks players
Sheffield Steelers players
South Carolina Stingrays players
Undrafted National Hockey League players
Canadian expatriate ice hockey players in England
Canadian expatriate ice hockey players in Scotland
Canadian expatriate ice hockey players in Northern Ireland
Canadian expatriate ice hockey players in the United States